Brevicellicium olivascens is a species of corticioid fungus in the family Hydnodontaceae. It is found in Europe.

References

Fungi described in 1892
Fungi of Europe
Fungal plant pathogens and diseases
Trechisporales